Viacheslav Maksymovych Chornovil (24 December 1937 – 25 March 1999) was a Ukrainian politician and Soviet dissident. As a prominent Ukrainian dissident in the Soviet Union, he was arrested multiple times in the 1960s, 1970s, and 1980s for his political views. From 1992 onwards, Chornovil was one of the leaders of Rukh, the People's Movement of Ukraine, which was the first opposition party in democratic Ukraine, and editor-in-chief of the newspaper Chas-Time (Chas) from 1995. One of the most prominent political figures of the 1980s and 1990s, Chornovil paved the way for contemporary Ukraine to regain its independence.

Born in Kyiv Oblast, Chornovil was originally a journalist in newspaper and television before he was fired and sentenced to forced labour due to his dissident activism. Chornovil became one of Ukraine's foremost independence activists, and was an early member of the Ukrainian Helsinki Group. In 1988, he founded the People's Movement of Ukraine, the first non-communist party in Ukraine, and ran unsuccessfully to be the first president of independent Ukraine in 1991, losing to Leonid Kravchuk.

Following the 1994 Ukrainian presidential election, Chornovil became one of President Leonid Kuchma's foremost critics. Though he was expected to face Kuchma in the 1999 Ukrainian presidential election, his sudden and mysterious death in a car accident brought an end to his campaign. Chornovil has been remembered as one of the most significant figures in Ukraine's regained independence in 1991.

Early life and education
Viacheslav Maksymovych Chornovil was born in Yerky, in what was then the Ukrainian Soviet Socialist Republic. Chornovil enrolled into the University of Kyiv initially at the College of Philology (faculty), but after the first semester transferred to the College of Journalism.

In 1958, due to conflict in the university, he took a break from studying and went for construction project in Zhdanov (now Mariupol) for a blast furnace, and later worked for the Kyiv Komsomolets. Chornovil was a member of the Komsomol of Ukraine. He graduated in 1960 with honours, and defended his diploma with a thesis titled "Publicist Work of Borys Hrinchenko".

Journalist
Chornovil worked for various newspapers and in television in Lviv and Kyiv between 1960 and 1964.

In 1964, he moved to Vyshhorod and participated in the construction of the Kyiv Hydroelectric Station (see Kyiv Reservoir). During the same year, Chornovil also enrolled as a postgraduate student (see Candidate of Sciences) of the Drahomov National Pedagogical University, but was not allowed to study.

On 5 September 1965, with Ivan Dzyuba and Vasyl Stus, Chornovil protested at the premier of Sergei Paradjanov's "Shadows of Forgotten Ancestors" outside the Ukraina Movie Theatre. This led to him being sacked from his job and searched by the police. For refusing to be a witness and testify at the trials of the Horyn brothers, Chornovil was given three months of forced labour.

He acquired the reputation of a dissident after documenting the illegal imprisonment of certain Ukrainian intellectuals. Later, he covered a similar story about twenty Ukrainians ("Woe from Wit"). Charged with libel and sentenced to three years in a maximum security prison, Chornovil was released after 18 months under a general amnesty in 1967, marking the fiftieth anniversary of the 1917 October Revolution. The Times awarded him the Nicholas Tomalin Prize for the documentation of the trials.

Dissident
During his exile in 1969, Chornovil married to Atena Pashko. In 1970, he managed to find a job at the meteorological station in Zakarpattia, provided a manual labour for an archaeological expedition to the Odessa Region, and at the railroad station "Sknyliv" in Lviv. At the same time Chornovil created an underground magazine Ukraine Herald. From 1971 onwards, he worked for the Lviv department of the Ukraine Nature Conservation Society.

He was imprisoned a second time in 1972 for being involved in Ukrainian independence movements and affiliated publications. This time, Chornovil was given six years of imprisonment and three more years of exile. He served this term of imprisonment in Mordovia, in camps for political prisoners in the villages of Ozernoye and Barashevo, where he frequently took part in protests, demonstrations and hunger strikes. Chornovil spent half of his term at Camp 17 in the punishment cell or in solitary confinement in the camp prison.

Chornovil renounced his Soviet citizenship and decided to move to Canada in 1975, but was not permitted to do so. In 1976, he joined the newly-formed Ukrainian Helsinki Group, set up to monitor the Soviet Union's compliance with the 1975 Helsinki Accords. In 1978, Chornovil was exiled to the Soviet Far East, travelling the thousands of miles by train, and on foot to the village of Chappandu, in Yakutia. There, he worked as a labourer at a local state farm (sovkhoz), later as a supplier in Nyurba. In 1978, he was admitted to the International PEN society.

Chornovil was arrested yet again in April 1981, on charges of "attempted rape" and sentenced to five years imprisonment. In protest he went on a 120-day-long hunger strike. He was released in 1983, but following an objection by the Prosecutor of the Yakut ASSR, he was not to allow return to Ukraine. Finally back in West Ukraine, Chornovil could only find work in May 1985 as a stoker, at both the Lviv Miskrembudtrest (City Maintenance Construction Trust) and a specialized school in the city.

Politician
In the late 1980s, he actively participated in the Ukrainian national movement becoming the first leader of the People's Movement of Ukraine (better known as Rukh). In 1988, there was a first attempt to create the "Democratic Front in support of Perestroika" in Lviv only to be dispersed by the Soviet OMON canine unit. Later he promoted several nationally oriented actions, one of them was the human chain that took place on 21 January 1990 and commemorated the act of unification of the Ukrainian lands in 1919 (see Act Zluky).

Chornovil ran for President of Ukraine in 1991, but was defeated, winning only in western Ukraine. He was one of the most important members of Rukh, People's Movement of Ukraine. He was elected to the Verkhovna Rada for the People's Movement of Ukraine in 1994 and 1998, and was the head of that party.

Vyacheslav Chornovil was founder of the independent socio-political newspaper Chas-Time (known also as Chas), and served as editor-in-chief from 1995 to 1999.

In 1999, Rukh almost dissolved due to disagreements within. There are speculations that the failure to liquidate the party led to the road accident that took Chornovil's life. This is mentioned in Volodymyr Onyshchenko's documentary, He Who Awoke the Stone State.

Opposition to Leonid Kuchma 
Following the 1994 Ukrainian presidential election, Leonid Kuchma became President of Ukraine. Kuchma's subsequent crackdown on independent media caused Chornovil to become one of the foremost critics of his government.

Chornovil was expected to be the main opposition candidate to incumbent president Leonid Kuchma in the 1999 presidential election, but his death brought an abrupt end to his campaign.

Death and remembrance
On 25 March 1999, Chornovil and his assistant, Yevhen Pavlov, were driving near Boryspil when their vehicle was struck head-on by a truck, killing both instantly. Tens of thousands of Ukrainians attended his funeral.

The official investigation carried by the Ministry of Internal Affairs concluded that the crash was purely accidental and discovered no evidence of foul play. However, some of Chornovil's supporters called his death a political murder and called on bringing those responsible for it to justice. The theory of murder is stated on the website dedicated to Vyacheslav Chornovil and created by his son Taras Chornovil, a deputy of Verkhovna Rada formerly from the Party of Regions.

In 2003, the National Bank of Ukraine issued a commemorative coin with the nominal of 2 hryvnias dedicated to Chornovil.

On 23 August 2006, President Viktor Yushchenko unveiled a monument to Chornovil and ordered a new investigation into his death. On 6 September 2006, Yuri Lutsenko, the head of the Ministry of Internal Affairs, announced that based on the information he saw, he personally believes that Chornovil was a victim of murder rather than a car accident. Lutsenko stated further that the investigation is now carried by the Office of the Prosecutor General of Ukraine and the Security Service of Ukraine, the law enforcement authorities not under Lutsenko's control. He went further, alluding that "certain circles" in the Prosecutor's Office and Security Service are stonewalling the investigation. However, on 9 August, Oleksandr Medvedko, the Prosecutor General of Ukraine, commented at the news conference that Lutsenko's statement is "unprofessional" as his conclusions are based on unreliable information.

On 25 March 2009, another funeral service was held near the memorial sign in Boryspil, and admirers, including then-Mayor of Kyiv Leonid Chernovetskyi, laid flowers on his monument in Kyiv to mark the 10-year anniversary of Chornovil's death.

In 2009, a Ukrainian stamp devoted to Chornovil was issued.

Legacy 
In some cities of Ukraine there is Vyacheslava Chornovola Street

See also
List of unsolved deaths

Family
 Father – Maksym Yosypovych Chornovil (1909-1987), a teacher of Ukrainian language and literature
 Mother – Kylyna Kharitonivna Tereshchenko (1909-1985), a teacher in elementary school
 Sister – Valentyna Maksymivna Chronovil (1948–present)
 First wife – Iryna Mykolayivna Brunets
 Son – Andriy Chornovil (1962–present), a doctor and professor of the Lviv Medical University
 Second wife – Olena Tymofiyivna Antoniv (1937-1986), a dissident (perished in an auto accident)
 Son – Taras Chornovil (1964–present), a member of parliament of Ukraine (2000-2012)
 Third wife – Atena Vasylivna Pashko (1931-2012), a Ukrainian poet
 Stepdaughter – Iryna Vasylivna Volytska-Zubko, a theatrical director at the "Teatr v Korzyni" (Theater in a basket)

References and footnotes

External links
 
 Ukrainian Weekly newspaper biography
 Vyacheslav Chornovil's Death
 Pictures of the Monument
 Obituary, The Times
 "He who awake the Stone state" (DVD) in the library of the Kyiv-Mohyla Academy

1937 births
1999 deaths
Burials at Baikove Cemetery
Candidates in the 1991 Ukrainian presidential election
Komsomol of Ukraine members
People from Cherkasy Oblast
People of the Revolution on Granite
People's Movement of Ukraine politicians
Recipients of the Order of State
Recipients of the Shevchenko National Prize
Road incident deaths in Ukraine
Soviet dissidents
Soviet human rights activists
Taras Shevchenko National University of Kyiv alumni
Ukrainian anti-Soviet resistance movement
Ukrainian dissidents
Ukrainian Helsinki Group
Ukrainian human rights activists
Ukrainian nationalists
Ukrainian anti-communists
Death conspiracy theories
20th-century Ukrainian journalists
First convocation members of the Verkhovna Rada
Second convocation members of the Verkhovna Rada
Third convocation members of the Verkhovna Rada
Dubravlag detainees
Members of the Lviv Oblast Council